"Your Song" is a song written by English musician Elton John and songwriter Bernie Taupin, and performed by John. It was John's first international Top 10 chart single.

"Your Song" was first released by American rock band Three Dog Night in March 1970 as an album track on It Ain't Easy. John was an opening act for the band at the time and allowed them to record it. They did not release it as a single as they wanted to let John, then an upcoming artist, have a go with it. John's version was recorded at Trident Studios in London in January 1970 and appeared in April as the first cut on his self-titled second studio album. Following "Border Song" as the first album single, "Your Song" was released in the United States in October 1970 as the B-side to "Take Me to the Pilot". Both sides received airplay, but "Your Song" was preferred by disc jockeys and replaced "Take Me to the Pilot" as the A-side, eventually making it to number eight on the Billboard chart. The song also peaked at number 7 on the UK Singles Chart, as well as charting in the top 10 in several other countries.

In 1998, "Your Song" was inducted into the Grammy Hall of Fame. In 2004, the song was placed at number 136 on Rolling Stones list of "The 500 Greatest Songs of All Time", 137 in its 2010 list, and 202 in its 2021 list. The song is listed among the Rock and Roll Hall of Fame's 500 Songs that Shaped Rock and Roll. A demo version was included in John's 1990 box set album To Be Continued. In 2017, the song was voted by the British public as The Nation's Favourite Elton John Song in a UK-wide poll for ITV.

The song has been covered by a number of artists, including Rod Stewart, Lady Gaga and Ellie Goulding. The song was also covered by Ewan McGregor in the 2001 musical film Moulin Rouge! and by Taron Egerton in the 2019 film Rocketman. In 2018, the song was certified 2× Platinum by the RIAA.

Composition and inspiration
One widespread story is that Bernie Taupin wrote the song's lyrics after breakfast one morning on the roof of 20 Denmark Street, London, where John worked for a music publishing firm as an office boy, hence the line "I sat on the roof and kicked off the moss." However, Taupin has denied this, pointing out that John had stopped working there by the time they met. According to Taupin, "I scribbled the lyric down on a lined notepad at the kitchen table of Elton's mother's apartment in the London suburb of Northwood Hills, breakfast time sometime in 1969. That’s it. Plain and simple."

The instrumental focus is on John's Leon Russell-influenced piano work, along with acoustic guitar, Paul Buckmaster's string accompaniment, and a shuffling rhythm section.

The lyrics express the romantic thoughts of an innocent person. John sings a straightforward love-song lyric at the beginning: "It's a little bit funny this feeling inside / I'm not one of those who can easily hide / I don't have much money, but boy, if I did / I'd buy a big house where we both could live." At times the self-deprecating narrator stumbles to get out his feelings, which despite being a melodramatic device, AllMusic calls "effective and sweet":

"Your Song" was the inspiration for the song "We All Fall in Love Sometimes" on John's 1975 album Captain Fantastic and the Brown Dirt Cowboy.

The song is performed in the key of E-flat major.

Reception
"Your Song" was praised by critics upon its release and in subsequent years, and is widely regarded as one of John's greatest songs. Writing in NME on its release, Derek Johnson wrote, "The song itself is glowing and strangely haunting, the scoring is smooth and delicate and the performance is symptomatic of a new era in pop idols." Bill Janovitz from AllMusic described it as a "near-perfect song".

In a 1975 interview with Rolling Stone, John Lennon recalled, 

John Mendelsohn from Rolling Stone called the song a "pretty McCartney-esque ballad". In the 2019 book Elton John: Every Album, Every Song – 1969–1979, author Peter Kearns made the following quote in reference to "Your Song". "The words securely insulate themselves against possible criticism by admitting their ineptitude for the task at hand".

In 2018, The Guardian ranked the song number four on their list of the 50 greatest Elton John songs, and in 2022, Billboard ranked the song number two on their list of the 75 greatest Elton John songs.

Commercial performance and impact
"Your Song" rose to number eight on the Billboard Hot 100 and number seven on the UK Singles Chart by January 1971. In 2002, John re-recorded the song as a duet with opera singer Alessandro Safina for the first Sport Relief charity telethon and released it on 15 July 2002; this version reached number four in the UK. In the US it was certified Gold and Platinum on 13 December 2012 by the Recording Industry Association of America (RIAA) for sales of over one million digital downloads. On 23 July 2021, it was certified 2× Platinum by the British Phonographic Industry (BPI), denoting sales in excess of 1,200,000 digital downloads. In the US in April 2018, it was certified 2× Platinum for sales of two million digital downloads by the Recording Industry Association of America.

Track listings

Credits and personnel
Credits adapted from the liner notes of Elton John.

 Elton John – piano, vocals
 Paul Buckmaster – arrangement, conducting
 Frank Clark – acoustic guitar
 Gus Dudgeon – production
 Colin Green – guitar
 Clive Hicks – 12-string guitar
 Barry Morgan – drums
 Dave Richmond – double bass

Charts

Weekly charts

Year-end charts

Certifications

Performances and renditions
John has played "Your Song" at almost every live performance during his solo career, and issued several live versions, including with his band, solo on piano and with orchestra. One notable version was during his Central Park concert in 1980, when John was dressed as Donald Duck.

A live version of John's concert with the Melbourne Symphony Orchestra, recorded on 14 December 1986, was included in his 1987 album Live in Australia with the Melbourne Symphony Orchestra. 
He also performed "Your Song" live with Ronan Keating at Madison Square Garden, New York, in 2000, the recording of which can be found on Keating's 2010 album Duet. On 20 October 2001, John performed the song with Billy Joel at The Concert for New York City, a tribute show to the September 11 attacks. In 2004, Daniel Bedingfield performed a cover of the song to Elton John at An Ivor Novello Tribute: Elton John. John performed "Your Song" to open the Concert for Diana on 1 July 2007. John and Lady Gaga performed a medley of "Your Song" with Gaga's song "Speechless" at the 52nd Annual Grammy Awards on 31 January 2010. At the 2013 Grammy Awards, Colombian singer Juanes performed a bilingual rendition of "Your Song". Gaga recorded a cover of the song for the 2018 tribute album Revamp: Reimagining the Songs of Elton John & Bernie Taupin.

Soul singer Billy Paul released a version of the song on Philadelphia International in 1972, as the B-side of "Me and Mrs. Jones", then in 1977, which reached number 37 on the UK Singles Chart and spent seven weeks in the top 75. Also in 1972, the song was covered by Finnish band Alwari Tuohitorvi, with Finnish lyrics.

In 2018, John starred in the annual Christmas advert of British department store chain John Lewis & Partners, titled "The Boy & the Piano". Set to "Your Song", it featured John reminiscing about his life in reverse, culminating with him receiving a piano for Christmas as a child.
In 2014, singer Aloe Blacc released “The Man” from his 2014 album “Lift Your Spirit” and the melody of this album hinges on the melody of this song.

On 12 April 2021, Team Nick Jonas members Rachel Mac and Bradley Sinclair sang the song for the battle rounds of The Voice, despite the battle being leaked online three days prior to its air date. Although both have strong effort, Jonas ultimately went with Mac as the winner, and Sinclair was eliminated from the competition.

On 19 November 2021, Janet Devlin released her version of the track.

In December 2021, it was reported that the original plan was for John to sing "Your Song" at the funeral of Diana, Princess of Wales, but the final choice was "Candle in the Wind 1997".

Rod Stewart version

English singer and songwriter Rod Stewart covered "Your Song" for the tribute album Two Rooms: Celebrating the Songs of Elton John & Bernie Taupin (1991). His version was released in April 1992 as a double A-side single with "Broken Arrow".

Track listings
 European CD maxi single and UK 12-inch single
 "Your Song" – 4:47
 "Broken Arrow" – 4:11
 "Mandolin Wind" – 5:27
 "The First Cut Is the Deepest" – 3:52

 UK and French 7-inch single
A. "Your Song" – 4:47
AA. "Broken Arrow" – 4:11

Charts

Ellie Goulding version

English singer and songwriter Ellie Goulding covered "Your Song" for the reissue of her debut studio album, titled Bright Lights. Produced by Ben Lovett of Mumford & Sons, it was released digitally on 12 November 2010 as the re-release's lead single. The song was featured in the Christmas 2010 television advert for department store chain John Lewis.

Goulding performed "Your Song" at the reception party of Prince William and Catherine Middleton's wedding at Buckingham Palace on 29 April 2011, to which the couple shared their first dance. She also performed the song on Saturday Night Live on 7 May 2011, along with "Lights". Goulding's version was featured at the end of the 29 July 2011 episode of the Syfy supernatural drama series Haven, titled "Love Machine".

Critical reception
Nick Levine of Digital Spy gave the song four out of five stars, commenting that producer Lovett "shrouds her beautifully fluttery vocals in little but piano and strings, just adding a few harmonies towards the finish, allowing her to draw out the tenderness in Bernie Taupin's lyrics and the utter loveliness of one of Elton John's very best melodies. The result is a quiet, modest triumph, but a triumph nonetheless." Caryn Ganz of Spin magazine opined that her cover is "everything Gaga's Grammy version wasn't—a tender, vulnerable gift". AllMusic critic Jon O'Brien, in his review for Bright Lights, called it "unimaginative" and felt that it "sounds out of place alongside the rest of her rather more adventurous material."

Commercial performance
"Your Song" debuted at number 39 on the UK Singles Chart for the week of 14 November 2010. The single jumped to number three the following week, selling 84,896 copies. In its third week, it climbed to its peak position of number two (behind The X Factor Finalists 2010's cover of David Bowie's "'Heroes'") on sales of 72,292 copies, becoming Goulding's highest-peaking single until 2013. It maintained its position the following week, selling 63,753 units. The song also topped the UK Singles Downloads Chart for the week ending 11 December 2010.

The single was certified double platinum by the British Phonographic Industry (BPI) on 24 September 2021 and had sold 826,000 copies in the UK by August 2013. Elsewhere, "Your Song" reached number four in Austria, number five in Ireland, number 22 in Denmark, number 25 in Sweden and number 56 in Switzerland.

Music video
The music video, directed by Ben Coughlan and Max Knight, premiered on YouTube on 14 November 2010. Shot in a home video look, it depicts Goulding's life on the road with friends. Areas from Goulding's hometown of Hereford can be seen throughout the video, including Hereford railway station.

Track listing
Digital single
"Your Song" – 3:10

Credits and personnel
Credits adapted from the liner notes of Bright Lights.

 Ellie Goulding – vocals
 Matt Lawrence – engineering, mixing
 Ben Lovett – backing vocals, kick drum, piano, production
 Ruth de Turberville – backing vocals, cello
 Matt Wiggins – timpani

Charts

Weekly charts

Year-end charts

Certifications

Lady Gaga version
American singer Lady Gaga recorded a cover of "Your Song" for the 2018 tribute album Revamp: Reimagining the Songs of Elton John & Bernie Taupin. It was released digitally as a promotional single on 30 March 2018. Gaga performed the song at The Recording Academy's tribute concert, titled "Elton John: I'm Still Standing – A Grammy Salute", which aired on CBS on 10 April 2018. In April, during the release of Revamp in Japan (there re-titled Your Song: Elton John Best Hits Cover), Lady Gaga's cover of "Your Song" was widely promoted on the country's radio stations, becoming the most played song on Japanese radio in mid-April. The song reached the top thirty in Hungary, Japan, Mexico, the digital downloads chart of Spain and the US Pop Digital Songs chart.

Charts

References

External links

1970 songs
1970 singles
1970s ballads
1971 singles
1992 singles
2010 singles
DJM Records singles
Ellie Goulding songs
Elton John songs
Lady Gaga songs
Polydor Records singles
Pop ballads
Rock ballads
Rod Stewart songs
Song recordings produced by Gus Dudgeon
Songs with lyrics by Bernie Taupin
Songs with music by Elton John
Three Dog Night songs
Uni Records singles
Warner Records singles